, nicknamed Mu-san,  is  the head coach of the Sun Rockers Shibuya in the Japanese B.League.

Head coaching record

|- 
|- style="background:#FDE910;"
| style="text-align:left;"|Ryukyu Golden Kings
| style="text-align:left;"|2013-14
| 52||43||9|||| style="text-align:center;"|1st in Western|||4||4||0||
| style="text-align:center;"|Bj Champions
|- 
| style="text-align:left;"|Ryukyu Golden Kings
| style="text-align:left;"|2014-15
| 52||42||10|||| style="text-align:center;"|2nd in Western|||5||2||3||
| style="text-align:center;"|Lost in 2nd round
|- 
|- style="background:#FDE910;"
| style="text-align:left;"|Ryukyu Golden Kings
| style="text-align:left;"|2015-16
| 52||40||12|||| style="text-align:center;"|2nd in Western|||6||6||0||
| style="text-align:center;"|Bj Champions
|- 
| style="text-align:left;"|Ryukyu Golden Kings
| style="text-align:left;"|2016-17
| 60||29||31|||| style="text-align:center;"|2nd in Western|||2||0||2||
| style="text-align:center;"|Lost in 1st round
|- 
| style="text-align:left;"|Sun Rockers Shibuya
| style="text-align:left;"|2018-19
| 52||26||26|||| style="text-align:center;"|4th in Eastern|||-||-||-||
| style="text-align:center;"|-
|- 
| style="text-align:left;"|Sun Rockers Shibuya
| style="text-align:left;"|2019-20
| 41||27||14|||| style="text-align:center;"|4th in Eastern|||-||-||-||
| style="text-align:center;"|-
|-

References

1969 births
Living people
Japanese basketball coaches
Ryukyu Golden Kings coaches
Senshu University alumni
Sun Rockers Shibuya coaches